Naoki (直樹) is a masculine Japanese given name and surname. Notable people with the name include:
 
, Japanese long jumper
Naoki Bandou, voice actor
Naoki Harada (原田直樹, born 1991), Japanese footballer
, Japanese footballer
Naoki Hattori (born 1966), race car driver
, Japanese footballer
, Japanese journalist, historian, social critic and biographer
, Japanese mixed martial artist
Naoki Izumiya (born 1951), president and CEO of Asahi Breweries
Naoki Kawamata (born 1985), Japanese rugby union player
, Japanese dancer and actor
Naoki Kodaka, Japanese composer
Naoki Maeda (disambiguation), multiple people
, Japanese novelist and comedian
, Japanese baseball player
Naoki Matsuda (1977-2011), soccer player
Naoki Matsudo (born 1973), motorbike racer
, Japanese footballer
, Japanese swimmer
Naoki Nakagawa, tennis player
, Japanese television personality
Naoki Sanjugo, novelist
 , Japanese illustrator, manga artist, and YouTuber
, Japanese composer
, Japanese footballer
Naoki Segi (born 1963), film director
Naoki Soma (born 1971), Japanese football defender
Naoki Takeshi, actor
Naoki Tanaka (disambiguation), multiple people
Naoki Tanisaki (born 1978), Japanese wrestler
Naoki Tatsuta (born 1950), Japanese voice actor
Naoki Urasawa (born 1960), Japanese manga artist
, Japanese footballer
Naoki Yamada (born 1990), soccer player
Naoki Yamamoto (racing driver) (山本尚貴, born 1988), Japanese racing driver
, Japanese video game producer, director and designer

Fictional characters
Naoki Kashima, the name given to the Demi-Fiend protagonist in the radio play version of Shin Megami Tensei: Nocturne
Naoki Domon, a character Gekisou Sentai Carranger

See also
Naoki Prize, a Japanese literary award presented semiannually

Japanese masculine given names